The 1940 Cupa României Final was the seventh final of Romania's most prestigious football cup competition. It was disputed between Venus București and Rapid București, and was won by Rapid București after 4 games. This final is unique in the history because the winner decided after 4 games, 3 games ended draw after extra-time and just after the third reply Rapid București won with 2–1.

Match details

Replay

Second replay

Third replay

See also 
List of Cupa României finals

References

External links
Romaniansoccer.ro

1940
Cupa
Romania